The Priest Wilderness is a U.S. Wilderness Area in the Glenwood/Pedlar Ranger District of the George Washington and Jefferson National Forests. The wilderness area is located just south of the Tye River, the Three Ridges Wilderness, and Virginia State Route 56.

Recreation 
The Appalachian Trail is the only major trail within the boundaries of this wilderness area. The AT here is maintained by the Natural Bridge Appalachian Trail Club, a trail maintenance club affiliated with the Appalachian Trail Conservancy. The AT southbound from Virginia State Route 56 to the summit of the Priest Mountain offers a 3,100 foot elevation gain over 4.3 miles. There is one Appalachian Trail shelter within the wilderness, the Priest Shelter, near the summit of The Priest.

See also
List of U.S. Wilderness Areas
Wilderness Act

References

External links
 National Forest Web site
 Wilderness.net
 TopoQuest topographic map
 The Priest hike detail

George Washington and Jefferson National Forests
IUCN Category Ib
Protected areas of Nelson County, Virginia
Wilderness areas of Virginia
Protected areas established in 2000
2000 establishments in Virginia